Quantum calculus, sometimes called calculus without limits, is equivalent to traditional infinitesimal calculus without the notion of limits. It defines "q-calculus" and "h-calculus", where h ostensibly stands for Planck's constant while q stands for quantum. The two parameters are related by the formula

where  is the reduced Planck constant.

Differentiation

In the q-calculus and h-calculus, differentials of functions are defined as

and

respectively. Derivatives of functions are then defined as fractions by the q-derivative

and by

In the limit, as h goes to 0, or equivalently as q goes to 1, these expressions take on the form of the derivative of classical calculus.

Integration

q-integral
A function F(x) is a q-antiderivative of f(x) if DqF(x) = f(x).
 which is called the Jackson integral of f(x).

The q-integral is a Riemann–Stieltjes integral with respect to a step function having infinitely many points of increase at the points qj, with the jump at the point qj being qj. If we call this step function gq(t) then dgq(t) = dqt.

h-integral
A function F(x) is an h-antiderivative of f(x) if DhF(x) = f(x). If a and b differ by an integer multiple of h then the definite integral  is given by a Riemann sum of f(x) on the interval  partitioned into subintervals of width h.

Example 
The corresponding expressions in q-calculus and h-calculus are

with the q-bracket

and

respectively. The expression  is then the q-calculus analogue of the simple power rule for
positive integral powers.
One may proceed further and develop, for example, equivalent notions of Taylor expansion, et cetera, and even arrive at q-calculus analogues for all of the usual functions one would want to have, such as an analogue for the sine function whose q-derivative is the appropriate analogue for the cosine.

History 
The h-calculus is just the calculus of finite differences, which had been studied by George Boole and others, and has proven useful in a number of fields, among them combinatorics and fluid mechanics. The q-calculus, while dating in a sense back to Leonhard Euler and Carl Gustav Jacobi, is only recently beginning to see more usefulness in quantum mechanics, having an intimate connection with commutativity relations and Lie algebra.

See also 
 Noncommutative geometry
 Quantum differential calculus
 Time scale calculus
 q-analog
 Basic hypergeometric series
 Quantum dilogarithm

Further reading 

 George Gasper, Mizan Rahman, Basic Hypergeometric Series, 2nd ed, Cambridge University Press (2004),

References